Euxoa cicatricosa is a moth of the family Noctuidae first described by Augustus Radcliffe Grote and Coleman Townsend Robinson in 1865. It is found in North America from south central Saskatchewan west to southern interior British Columbia; south to southern California, Arizona, New Mexico and western Texas; east to western Nebraska and North Dakota.

The wingspan is 29–32 mm. Adults are on wing in August to September. There is one generation per year.

External links

Euxoa
Moths of North America
Moths described in 1865